George S. H. Appleget was an American architect.

He was born in New Jersey and worked as a carpenter. By 1870, he had moved to Raleigh, North Carolina and worked as an architect.

Several of his works are listed on the U.S. National Register of Historic Places (NRHP).

Works include:
Andrews-Duncan House, Raleigh, NRHP-listed
Banker's House, Shelby, NRHP-listed
Cabarrus County Courthouse, Concord, NRHP-listed
Estey Hall, on the campus of Shaw University, Raleigh, NRHP-listed
Heck-Andrews House, Raleigh, NRHP-listed

References

Architects from North Carolina